Catholic Legion may refer to:

Current Organizations:
 Legion of Mary, a group of Catholic laypeople
 Legion of Christ, a group of Catholic priests

Defunct Organizations:
 Catholic Benevolent Legion, a defunct Life Insurance provider
 Catholic Legion of Decency, a defunct activist group